Jeff Fabry (born April 14, 1973, in Hanford, California) is an American amputee and Paralympic archer. He won bronze medals at the 2004 Summer Paralympics and the 2008 Summer Paralympics, and a gold medal at the United States at the 2012 Summer Paralympics.

He became disabled after he lost most of his right arm and right leg in a motorcycle accident when he was 15. He credits his wife, Crystal for getting him into the sport. He is also the father of two children: Rebecca & Joseph.

References

External links
 
 

1973 births
Living people
American male archers
Paralympic archers of the United States
Paralympic gold medalists for the United States
Paralympic bronze medalists for the United States
Paralympic medalists in archery
Archers at the 2004 Summer Paralympics
Archers at the 2008 Summer Paralympics
Archers at the 2012 Summer Paralympics
Medalists at the 2004 Summer Paralympics
Medalists at the 2008 Summer Paralympics
Medalists at the 2012 Summer Paralympics
People from Hanford, California
Sportspeople from California
American amputees
21st-century American people